Garaiyan, also spelled Gareyan or Gariyan, is a small village in Arrah block of Bhojpur district, Bihar, India. As of 2011, its population was 2, in 1 household, making it the least populous village in Bhojpur district.

References 

Villages in Bhojpur district, India